The Joker, a supervillain in DC Comics and archenemy of the superhero Batman, has appeared in various media. WorldCat (a catalog of libraries in 170 countries) records over 250 productions featuring the Joker as a subject, including films, television series, books, and video games. Live-action films featuring the character are typically the most successful.

The Joker has been portrayed by Cesar Romero in the 1966–1968 Batman television series and the 1966 Batman film; Jack Nicholson in the 1989 film Batman; Heath Ledger in the 2008 film The Dark Knight; Jared Leto in the 2016 film Suicide Squad and the 2021 director's cut Zack Snyder's Justice League; Cameron Monaghan in the FOX series Gotham; Joaquin Phoenix in the 2019 solo origin story film Joker, and Barry Keoghan in the 2022 film The Batman. Ledger won the Academy Award for Best Supporting Actor while Phoenix won the Academy Award for Best Actor, making the Joker one of the only three characters played by two actors to be awarded an Oscar for both portrayals (the others being Vito Corleone and Anita from West Side Story). Over the years, various actors have provided the character's voice in television, animation, and video game form. Mark Hamill is often credited as the most iconic voice portrayal of the Joker.

Live-action

Television

Adventures of Superman
At the Daily Planet's news stand, the Joker's face could be seen on the cover of a Batman comic book in the Adventures of Superman episodes Mystery in Wax and Crime Wave.

Batman and Robin are also on the cover of that comic.

Batman (1966–1968 TV series)
Cesar Romero portrayed the Joker in the 1960s Batman television series. Romero refused to shave his distinctive moustache for the role, so it was partially visible beneath the white face makeup applied. This version of the Joker is based on the character in the 1960s comics, who is more of an elaborate prankster who uses harmless weapons and Vaudeville-type humor to commit his crimes. Even though he did try to kill both Batman and Robin in various episodes, he wasn't homicidal like his comic book counterpart.

Batman OnStar commercials (2000–2002)

The Joker was played by Curtis Armstrong in one of the six Batman OnStar commercials that ran from 2000 to 2002.

Birds of Prey (2002–2003 TV series)
The Joker makes a cameo appearance in an episode of 2002–2003 series Birds of Prey, portrayed by Roger Stoneburner and voiced by Mark Hamill (who has voiced the Joker in various DC projects). He and his men appear outside of Barbara Gordon's apartment where he shoots Barbara when she answers the door. Then he quotes "Knock knock, who's there? Batgirl, past tense!"

Gotham (2014–2019)

The mythology of the Joker is explored throughout Gotham, a television series focusing on the beginnings of the Batman lore. Believing that the Joker should not precede Batman, showrunner Bruno Heller initially did not want to use the character, but later decided to "scratch the surface" of his origin because "this is America — nobody wants to wait." Jerome Valeska, the mentally unhinged son of a nymphomaniac circus performer, was introduced as an homage to the Joker in the first season, portrayed by Cameron Monaghan. While Monaghan was not comfortable drawing from the previous live-action actors who had played the Joker, he did take influence from Mark Hamill in his performance, as well as various comic books featuring the supervillain. The character returned at the start of the second season but was promptly killed off, after which various citizens begin imitating his actions and a voice-over proclaims that his legacy will be "death and madness." This was done to create a deep-rooted mythology for the Joker's backstory in Gotham City. In the fourth season, Monaghan begins playing Jerome's twin brother, Jeremiah Valeska. The character was intended to represent different characteristics of the Joker absent from Jerome. The series finale leaves it ambiguous as to whether or not Jeremiah becomes the Joker later in the show's continuity. During the virtual DC FanDome event in 2020, a documentary titled The Joker: Put on a Happy Face was made to celebrate the character's 80th anniversary. This documentary includes Jeremiah Valeska from Gotham among the various iterations of the Joker adapted for film and television.

Powerless (2017)
The Joker makes a cameo in the Powerless episode "Wayne or Lose".

Titans (2018)

Joker makes a cameo in the Titans episode "Dick Grayson." He is shown as one of the several villains murdered by Batman in a dark future that Trigon subjected Dick Grayson to. In the season 3 premiere episode "Barbara Gordon", Joker (portrayed by stuntman Mustafa Bulut) killed Jason, then got captured by the GCPD and sent back to Arkham. Later in the episode, it is revealed that Bruce killed the Joker. In the episode "Lazarus", his playing Joker cards are shown in Batman's trophy room in the Batcave. In the season 3 finale episode "Purple Rain", Beast Boy put in Joker's name in the security question which he got wrong.

Arrowverse
Joker was confirmed to be part of the Arrowverse in Batwoman, portrayed by Nathan Dashwood. In the pilot episode, his hijacking of a bus led to the accident that separated Kate Kane from Beth and their mother Gabi despite Batman's attempt to save them. In the episode "I'll Be Judge, I'll Be Jury", it was revealed that his real name is Jack Napier and had been previously prosecuted by assistant district attorney Angus Stanton. In "A Narrow Escape", it is revealed that Bruce had killed Joker at some point as Luke Fox revealed to Kate that "The Joker Is Not In Arkham". In season two, it was discovered that Jack Napier worked on a painting using intestinal blood from one of his victims as it is discovered that it contained the map to Coryana where Jacob Kane suspects that Kate is being held prisoner in. While the painting that Jacob took off a defeated Wolf Spider was a fake, the real one is in the possession of Safiyah Sohail's former minion Ocean. In "Kane, Kate", a brainwashed Kate stolen all of Batman's trophies belongs to his enemies from the Batcave which includes the Joker's acid flower. In the season 2 finale episode "Power", Alice used Joker's acid flower on Roman Sionis' face and having his mask welded into his face claiming that Joker is better than him. In the third season episode "A Lesson from Professor Pyg", Jada Jet revealed to Ryan Wilder that her son (and Ryan's half-brother) Marquis Jet (portrayed by Nick Creegan) was attacked by Joker during his bus hijacking by placing his electric joy buzzer on his head, rendering him psychopathic. Marquis ultimately carries on the Joker's legacy over the course of the season and takes over as CEO of Wayne Enterprises after a hostile takeover. He sports purple hair and an orange suit and acquires Joker inspired items. The episode "Broken Toys" revealed that Joker had a toymaker minion named Kiki Roulette (portrayed by Judy Reyes) who built Joker's joy buzzer as she allies with Marquis. In the episode "We're All Mad Here", Joker was finally seen when Marquis recaps his encounter with Joker and Alice recalls the hijacked bus running Gabi's car off the bridge. Marquis quoted to Alice that fate brought them together.

Film

Batman (1966)

Cesar Romero reprised his role in the 1966 film Batman, in which the Joker is a member of the United Underworld, alongside fellow Gotham City villains the Penguin (Burgess Meredith), the Riddler (Frank Gorshin), and Catwoman (Lee Meriwether).

Batman (1989)

Jack Nicholson played the Joker in Tim Burton's 1989 film Batman. The Newsweek review of the film stated that the best scenes are due to the surreal black comedy portrayed in the Joker. In 2003, American Film Institute ranked Nicholson's performance #45 on their list of 50 greatest film villains. Hugo Blick and David U. Hodges play younger versions of the character in flashbacks in Batman and Batman Forever, respectively.

In the film, Jack Napier is the right-hand man of mob boss Carl Grissom (Jack Palance) prior to his transformation into the Joker. During a confrontation with the vigilante Batman (Michael Keaton) in a chemical factory, Napier's face is wounded by a ricocheting bullet and he falls into a vat of chemical waste, turning his skin white, his hair green and his lips red. A botched attempt at plastic surgery leaves him with a permanent rictus grin. Driven insane by his reflection, the Joker kills Grissom and takes over his syndicate, launching a crime wave designed to "outdo" Batman, who he thinks is getting too much press. The Joker describes himself as "the world's first fully functional homicidal artist" who makes avant-garde "art" by killing people with cosmetics laced with Smylex, which leaves its victims with a grotesque grin similar to his own. Bruce Wayne later recognizes the Joker as the mugger who murdered his parents years before, leading him down the path of becoming a crime-fighter. The Joker nearly massacres Gotham City's bicentennial celebration and kidnaps reporter Vicki Vale (Kim Basinger) to draw Batman out to a climactic battle atop a Gothic cathedral. After telling Batman that they "made each other", the Joker attempts to escape via helicopter, but Batman ties a grappling hook around his leg and attaches it to a stone gargoyle, causing the Joker to fall to his death when the statue breaks loose of its moorings.

Nicholson was to reprise his role in Batman Unchained, the fifth film planned for the series. The Joker was to return as a hallucination in Batman's mind caused by the Scarecrow's fear toxin, and Harley Quinn was to appear as his daughter trying to get revenge on Batman for his death. Due to the critical and commercial failure of Batman & Robin, however, this film was cancelled.

The Dark Knight (2008)

Heath Ledger played Joker in Christopher Nolan's 2008 film The Dark Knight. Ledger's interpretation of the character – that of a "psychopathic, mass-murdering, schizophrenic clown with zero empathy" – was specifically influenced by the graphic novels Batman: The Killing Joke and Arkham Asylum: A Serious House on Serious Earth. In the film, he wears the character's traditional color palette, while his facial appearance includes smeared clown makeup that covers facial scars of a Glasgow smile. This version of the Joker embodies themes of chaos, anarchy, and obsession; he expresses a desire to upset social order through crime and defines himself by his conflict with Batman (Christian Bale). The character explores techniques found in Ledger's previous performances, including his clown act in Terry Gilliam's fantasy film The Brothers Grimm. It also references paintings by artist Francis Bacon, Anthony Burgess' novel A Clockwork Orange, and various punk rock musicians.

In the film, the Joker is hired by Gotham City's mob bosses to kill Batman and announces that he will kill people every day until Batman takes off his mask in public and surrenders himself to police. During his reign of terror, he kills several people in Gotham, including Bruce Wayne's childhood sweetheart Rachel Dawes (Maggie Gyllenhaal) and scars Gotham District Attorney Harvey Dent's (Aaron Eckhart) face, transforming him into the insane vigilante Two-Face. Batman ultimately defeats him, but the Joker gloats that he has won "the battle for Gotham's soul" by corrupting Dent, and tells Batman that "you and I are destined to do this forever" as he is taken to Arkham Asylum.

The Joker is considered to be Ledger's finest performance; he himself regarded it as his most enjoyable. When the film was released in July 2008, six months after the actor had died from an accidental prescription drug overdose, the performance caused a sensation and received universal acclaim; Ledger was posthumously awarded the Academy Award for Best Supporting Actor.

DC Extended Universe (2016–present)

Jared Leto portrays the Joker in the DC Extended Universe. Originally set to appear in Zack Snyder's Batman v Superman: Dawn of Justice, the character was ultimately cut and only referenced in the film.

Jared Leto debuts as the Joker in David Ayer's 2016 film Suicide Squad. Although many scenes featuring the Joker were omitted from the theatrical release, some of this unused footage did make it into the extended cut. Leto also appeared as the Joker in the music video "Purple Lamborghini", by Skrillex and Rick Ross, from the film's soundtrack. Mark Hamill, the voice of the Joker in various DC projects, said that he "loved" Leto's take on the character.

Despite not making an official appearance, the Joker's presence plays a pivotal part in the film Birds of Prey as the plot involves Harley Quinn (Margot Robbie) trying to cope with life in Gotham City without his protection. The Joker appears in animated form in the film's prologue which details Harley's life and separation from him while a scene of Jared Leto from Suicide Squad is used in a flashback sequence. In addition, an uncredited Johnny Goth portrayed the character from the back in a similar flashback scene in which Harley and Joker tattoo a man's face. This was done in this way since as the director felt that the film didn't need Leto to return for the character to still have a presence.

Leto reprised the role in Zack Snyder's Justice League, released in 2021 on HBO Max. The Joker appears in a post-apocalyptic premonition of Bruce Wayne in a role similar to the Ghost of Christmas Yet to Come from A Christmas Carol, portraying him as a character who motivates Batman to prevent Darkseid's (Ray Porter) invasion.

Joker (2019)

In 2016, Todd Phillips began working on a standalone Joker film, with intent for it to launch a line of films unconnected to the DCEU called DC Black. Development of the film was confirmed in August 2017; Phillips was attached to direct and co-write with Scott Silver, while Martin Scorsese was set to produce. The film, Joker, was released in October 2019.

In Joker, Joaquin Phoenix portrays Arthur Fleck, a party clown and aspiring stand-up comedian who suffers from a mental illness that causes pathological laughter. He lives with his abusive mother Penny (Frances Conroy) in Gotham City in 1981 and idolizes talk show host Murray Franklin (Robert De Niro). After losing his job for dropping a gun in a children's hospital, Arthur kills three Wayne Enterprises employees on a train in self defense, sparking city-wide protests. He slowly descends into insanity, killing his mother and the colleague (Glenn Fleshler) who gave him the gun. When he is invited on Franklin's show after being mocked on it, Arthur rants about society abandoning him and murders Franklin on live television. He is arrested, but is rescued by protesters in clown masks, and is celebrated by the protesters as a hero. His actions inspire a protester to kill the Waynes, making him indirectly responsible for Batman's existence. Phoenix was awarded the Academy Award for Best Actor for his performance, making him the second actor to receive an Academy Award for playing the character, following Heath Ledger. In June 2022, Philips confirmed a sequel is in development with Phoenix reprising his role. It was also reported that Joker: Folie à Deux will be a musical.

Space Jam: A New Legacy (2021) 

A Joker inspired by Jack Nicholson's 1989 Batman film appearance appears in Space Jam: A New Legacy (2021).

The Batman (2022) 

Barry Keoghan portrays the Joker in The Batman (2022), making a cameo appearance in the theatrical cut, where he befriends Edward Nashton (Paul Dano) from across his cell at Arkham State Hospital. In an extended deleted scene, the Batman (Robert Pattinson) reluctantly approaches the Joker to profile Nashton following his first two murders.

Joker's physical appearance in the film was designed with involvement from makeup artist Mike Marino, who similarly assisted in developing the fatsuit and prosthetics used for the film's iteration of Oswald "Oz" Cobblepot / Penguin (Colin Farrell). This incarnation of the character, seen only out-of-focus or in extreme close-ups, has a permanent smile as a result of an unknown biological condition, and physically appears to have peeling skin and a burned scalp with patches of hair. Matt Reeves described this adaptation of the Joker as deformed from an early age, like Joseph Merrick, the Phantom of the Opera or Gwynplaine in The Man Who Laughs (1928), and adept at using other people's horror to his advantage. The scene establishes that the Joker has a prior history with Batman, possibly as one of his first captures.

Animation

Television

Filmation
The Joker appears as a recurring villain in The Adventures of Batman, voiced by Larry Storch. He also appears in The New Adventures of Batman, voiced by Lennie Weinrib.

Hanna-Barbera
Storch reprised his role as the Joker in two episodes of The New Scooby-Doo Movies, in which he teams up with the Penguin and runs afoul of Batman, Robin and the Mystery Inc. gang.

The Joker appears in The Super Powers Team: Galactic Guardians episode "The Wild Cards", voiced by Frank Welker. He assists Darkseid by disguising himself as Ace, the leader of the Royal Flush Gang. Operating out of a giant house of cards, he recruits four thieves to be the rest of the Royal Flush Gang and leads them in capturing the heroes so that Darkseid's invasion force can attack Earth unimpeded. When Batman frees the captured heroes and they stop the invasion force, an enraged Darkseid hurls Joker through a portal that opens high in the sky. Wonder Woman catches him and he is arrested.

DC Animated Universe

The Joker appears in various series set in the DC Animated Universe, voiced by Mark Hamill, who is often credited as the iconic voice of the character because of his wide range of "joyful, gleeful, maniacal, [...] malevolent and evil laughs." The character debuted in Batman: The Animated Series (1992–1995). The show is notable for introducing his sidekick and lover, Harley Quinn (voiced by Arleen Sorkin), to such popularity that she became a character in the comics. The Joker was also featured as a central antagonist in the spin-off film Batman: Mask of the Phantasm (1993).

The Joker returned in the follow-up series The New Batman Adventures (1997–1999) with a stylistic redesign. His white skin now had a bluish-grey tinge, while his eyes had their sclerae removed, and were replaced by cavernous black spaces with white pupils. His trademark red lips were omitted, focusing more attention on his teeth, and his green hair was darkened. His suit's colors were also changed from purple and orange to purple and green. In the Superman: The Animated Series episode "World's Finest", a bankrupt Joker travels to Metropolis and makes a deal with Lex Luthor to kill Superman in exchange for a billion dollars only to be foiled by the combined efforts of Batman and Superman, seemingly getting killed in an explosion. In the Justice League episodes "Injustice For All" and "Wild Cards", the Joker joins Luthor's Injustice League, despite the latter's protests owing to their failed partnership in "World's Finest" and pits the Justice League against the Royal Flush Gang as part of an elaborate ruse, respectively. In "A Better World", a lobotomized Joker is briefly seen in an alternate universe ruled by the Justice Lords. The Joker was later featured in the Static Shock episode "The Big Leagues", in which he starts a crime spree only to be foiled by Static, Batman and Robin.

The Joker made his final chronological appearance in the direct-to-video feature film Batman Beyond: Return of the Joker (2000), in which he mysteriously returns to Gotham City 40 years in the future. Flashbacks reveal that the Joker with Harley Quinn's assistance kidnapped and tortured Robin (Tim Drake) for three weeks, turning him into an insane, miniature version of himself dubbed 'Joker Junior', learning Batman's secret identity in the process, leading to a violent confrontation with Batman that ended with him getting killed by Joker Junior who managed to fight of the brainwashing. The Joker's death was edited and redubbed amid controversy surrounding the Columbine High School massacre; the original version sees Joker Junior shoot the Joker in the heart, whereas the edited version simply sees him push the Joker into damaged cables to be electrocuted out of sight. However, a microchip implanted in Drake's neck was revealed to have possessed a copy of the Joker's consciousness and DNA, allowing him to take over his host in the future until he is defeated once and for all by the new Batman, Terry McGinnis, who destroys the microchip and the Joker alongside it. The Joker was redesigned once again, the flashback depicts him in his original attire but his face is redesigned as a mix of both his appearance in Batman: The Animated Series and The New Batman Adventures bringing back his red lips which are rendered in a darker tone and his yellow sclera with red eyes are brought back. His future version is the same but wears a purple jumpsuit and his hair is slicked back. The redesign depicted in the flashback was later used for his earlier chronological appearances in Static Shock and Justice League.

The Batman (2004–2008)
The Joker appears in The Batman, voiced by Kevin Michael Richardson. This version's trademark green hair is long and dreadlocked, although he maintains his recognizable white skin and red lips. He also sports red eyes, a more pointed chin, and crooked yellow teeth. He initially wore a purple and yellow straitjacket with blue pants, before later adopting his signature purple suit and spats on his feet, alongside long black fingerless gloves. This incarnation of the Joker relies slightly less on his comical gadgets and weaponry and is shown to be adept at parkour, also making use of a Monkey Kung Fu-like martial arts style during combat, using his feet as dexterously as his hands to climb and hang from walls and ceilings. Most notably, this Joker was responsible for creating the first Clayface, accidentally infecting Detective Ethan Bennett with the fumes from his Joker putty, and as a result, he became the target of Ethan's revenge.

The Joker also appears in the direct-to-video spin-off film The Batman vs. Dracula (2005). At the start, he launches a riot at Arkham Asylum, allowing both himself and the Penguin to escape, but during a subsequent confrontation with Batman, he accidentally falls into a river while wearing his electrified joy buzzer and is presumed dead. However, he ultimately survives and attempts to steal the treasure that he believes Penguin found; but what he presumes to be a chest is actually Dracula's casket, and upon accidentally awakening him, Joker is attacked and turned into a vampire. Unlike Dracula's other victims, Joker retains his personality and free will in this form and raids a blood bank, where he is captured by Batman and used as a test subject for a cure for his infliction. After being cured, Joker is sent back to Arkham Asylum.

Batman: The Brave and the Bold (2008–2011)
The Joker appears in Batman: The Brave and the Bold, voiced by Jeff Bennett. This version's appearance, personality and antagonism with Batman are similar to the Silver Age version drawn by Dick Sprang. His Earth-3 doppelganger is a vigilante known as the Red Hood, a capable fighter who can hold his own against Owlman and the Injustice Syndicate.

Young Justice (2010–2013, 2019-present)
The Joker appears in Young Justice, voiced by Brent Spiner as a member of Injustice League under orders of The Light.

Teen Titans Go! (2013–present)
The Joker makes multiple unspoken appearances in Teen Titans Go!, before finally having a speaking role in the episode "Pig in a Poke", voiced again by Jason Spisak.

Justice League Action (2016–2018)
The Joker appears in Justice League Action, with Mark Hamill reprising his role.

Scooby-Doo and Guess Who? (2019–present)
The Joker appears in the Scooby-Doo and Guess Who? episode "What a Night, For a Dark Knight!", voiced again by Hamill. He poses as Man-Bat while using harnesses to make him fly to kidnap Alfred Pennyworth and get access to Bruce Wayne's account. When Joker is defeated and unmasked, Daphne does give a positive compliment of his hair. Joker also made a cameo appearance in the episode, "One-Minute Mysteries", where the gang, who teamed up with The Flash, unmasked the Giant Teddy Bear believed to be the Joker and Fred unmasked again actually revealing The Trickster.

Harley Quinn (2019–present)
The Joker appears in Harley Quinn, voiced by Alan Tudyk. While most of his appearances in animation depict the Joker with a purple tuxedo, this version of the character wears a purple suit. He is also depicted with a partially-shaved head and a strong dislike of raisins; the latter of which is a running gag throughout the series. Joker is also a member of the Legion of Doom, and constantly bullies the lesser members until Harley points out that they are more powerful than him and that nobody has to listen to him.

In the first episode, he abandons Harley after she is captured, and leaves her in Arkham Asylum for over a year, until she eventually escapes on her own, with Poison Ivy's help. While Harley initially returns to the Joker, she eventually leaves him after realizing he doesn't care about her, thanks to a scheme orchestrated by Ivy with the Riddler's help, in which the Joker chooses to rescue a captured Batman from certain death rather than Harley. After Harley decides to become an independent criminal and surpass the Joker, he makes constant attempts to get back at her, culminating in taking over Gotham, killing Ivy, and capturing Harley, her crew, and Batman in the first-season finale. He then admits that he still loves Harley, and decides to throw her in acid that will render her "normal" and eliminate any feelings Joker still has for her. However, a resurrected Ivy saves Harley at the last minute and drops Joker in the acid, though not before he destroys all of Gotham. Despite physically surviving, the acid renders him sane and causes his skin to return to normal.

In the second season, the Joker, cured of his insanity, leads a normal life as a bartender. When Harley and Ivy encounter him by chance, they confirm he has no memories of his past self by having Doctor Psycho read his mind. He is later hired to work at a luxury bar at Wayne Tower and encounters Harley again, who tries to avoid him, only to end up handcuffed together during a hostage situation organized by Psycho and the Riddler so they can steal a mind control helmet and enslave an army of Parademons Harley previously brought to Gotham. After the Joker and Harley escape, she concludes that only the Justice League, who had been previously trapped inside a book by the Queen of Fables on the Joker's orders, can stop them. The Joker then mentions having several dreams about his past life, including the book, but he struggles to remember where it is, causing Harley to reluctantly toss him into a vat of acid at Ace Chemicals to turn him back into his original self. His memories recovered, the Joker recalls entering a relationship with a Latina nurse named Bethany, who found him among Gotham's ruins and nursed him back to health, and gifting the book to her, believing it to be an ordinary storybook. Under the threat of an explosive device Harley put in his head, the Joker takes her to Bethany's house, but she tosses the book away after he enrages her, causing it to get grabbed by a passing Parademon. While retrieving the book, the Joker reflects on his relationship with Bethany and realizes he found true love. He later reconciles with her and chooses to maintain both his criminal lifestyle and relationship with Bethany.

By the third season, the Joker has remained committed to his role as a suburban stepfather and has largely left his life of crime behind. In "Joker: The Killing Vote", he decides to run for mayor of Gotham City for the good of his stepchildren and gets elected on a technicality after Commissioner Gordon, having noticed his change for the better, drops out of the race.

DC Super Hero Girls (2019–present)
The Joker appears in DC Super Hero Girls, voiced by Jeremiah Watkins. He is depicted as a teenager along with his love interest Harley Quinn. In "#NightmareInGotham", Joker escapes from Arkham Reform School during Halloween night and teams up with Harley, Solomon Grundy, Gentleman Ghost, and She-Bat to wreak havoc in Gotham City.

Batwheels (2022–present)
The Joker appears in Batwheels, voiced by Mick Wingert.

Film

 The Jester, a heroic version of the Joker from a parallel earth, appears in Justice League: Crisis on Two Earths (2010), voiced by James Patrick Stuart. He is a member of the Justice League/Justice Underground.
 The Joker appears in Batman: Under the Red Hood (2010), voiced by John DiMaggio. During a confrontation with Batman and Robin (Jason Todd), he beats the latter with a crowbar before leaving him to perish in an explosion. Todd later returns as the Red Hood to force Batman to kill the Joker, but the Dark Knight refuses to do so and the Joker is returned to Arkham Asylum. Joker also appears in the film's interactive short film sequel Batman: Death in the Family (2020), with DiMaggio reprising his role.
 The Joker appears in the short animated promotional film DC Super Friends: The Joker's Playhouse (2010) produced for Fisher-Price Imaginext, voiced by John Kassir.
 The Joker appears in the two-part adaption of The Dark Knight Returns (2012–2013), voiced by Michael Emerson.
 The Joker appears in Lego Batman: The Movie – DC Super Heroes Unite (2013), an adaptation of the video game Lego Batman 2: DC Super Heroes (2012), voiced by Christopher Corey Smith.
 In the 2013 adaptation of the 2011 Flashpoint storyline, Martha Wayne briefly appears as the Joker in an alternate timeline, her laugh provided by Grey DeLisle.
 The Joker makes a cameo in Son of Batman (2014), voiced by Dee Bradley Baker.
 The Joker appears in Batman: Assault on Arkham (2014), set in the Batman: Arkham video game universe, with Troy Baker reprising his role from Batman: Arkham Origins. When the Suicide Squad breaks into Arkham Asylum, the Joker reunites with Harley Quinn before activating a bomb hidden in her mallet. Batman deactivates the bomb and the Joker escapes.
 John DiMaggio reprises his role as the Joker in the animated special Lego DC Comics: Batman Be-Leaguered (2014).
 Troy Baker reprises his role as the Joker in Batman Unlimited: Monster Mayhem (2015) and Batman Unlimited: Mechs vs. Mutants (2016), both part of the Batman Unlimited franchise.
 The Joker appears in Lego DC Comics Super Heroes: Justice League – Attack of the Legion of Doom, voiced again by John DiMaggio. In the film, he contends to be a member of the Legion of Doom, alongside the Cheetah, the Penguin, Man-Bat, Captain Cold, Gorilla Grodd, Deathstroke, and Giganta. As a meta joke, Mark Hamill, the longtime voice of the Joker, also contributes voices, but as Sinestro and the Trickster.
 The Joker appears in Lego DC Comics Super Heroes: Justice League – Gotham City Breakout (2016), voiced by Jason Spisak.
 Mark Hamill reprises his role as the Joker in the 2016 animated film adaptation of the Eisner Award-winning graphic novel Batman: The Killing Joke, which is the first DC animated film to be rated R.
 Jeff Bergman voices the Joker in Batman: Return of the Caped Crusaders (2016) and its sequel Batman vs. Two-Face (2017).
 The Joker appears in The Lego Batman Movie (2017), voiced by Zach Galifianakis. He ditches all his fellow Gotham criminals, except Harley who's helping him, and gathers an army of villains from the Phantom Zone to destroy Gotham City, while trying to goad Batman into admitting the Joker is his "greatest enemy".
 The Joker appears in DC Super Heroes vs. Eagle Talon (2017), voiced by Ken Yasuda.
 The Joker appears in Scooby-Doo! & Batman: The Brave and the Bold (2018), with Jeff Bennett reprising his role from Batman: The Brave and the Bold.
 The Joker briefly appears in Teen Titans Go! To the Movies (2018) in an altered future where the villains have taken over after the Teen Titans travel through time to prevent superheroes from existing. He is shown dropping bombs over Hollywood from a Joker-themed hot air balloon which he rides with Harley Quinn.
 The Joker appears Lego DC Comics Super Heroes: The Flash (2018), voiced again by Jason Spisak.
 A Feudal Japan version of the Joker appears in Batman Ninja (2018), voiced by Wataru Takagi and Tony Hale in Japanese and English respectively.
 The Joker appears in Batman vs. Teenage Mutant Ninja Turtles (2019), with Troy Baker reprising his role from the Batman Unlimited franchise. When exposed to the mutagen, he mutates into a cobra version of himself complete with a tail.
 The Joker appears in Batman: Hush, voiced again by Jason Spisak.
 Joker appears in the animated film Batman: The Long Halloween, voiced again by Troy Baker.
 Joker appears in the animated film Injustice, voiced by Kevin Pollak.

Video games

As Batman's nemesis, the Joker has appeared in several Batman-related video games.

Early appearances (1988–2003)
The Joker's earliest video game appearance was in Batman: The Caped Crusader (1988) developed by Ocean Software for 8-bit home computers such as the ZX Spectrum and Commodore 64 and by Data East for other platforms such as the Apple II, Commodore Amiga, and PC. The game contains two parts that can be played in any order—the Joker's story or the Penguin's story. The Joker also appears in several games based on the 1989 film, released between 1989 and 1992, including Batman: The Movie for the Amiga, Amstrad CPC, Atari ST, Commodore 64, MS-DOS, and ZX Spectrum; Batman: The Video Game for the Nintendo Entertainment System and Game Boy; Batman for the Genesis; and an arcade game, Batman.

Two games were released based on Batman: The Animated Series. The first was the Konami-developed game Batman: The Animated Series (1993) for Game Boy. The second, The Adventures of Batman & Robin, was released for the Super NES as an action adventure platform and for Genesis as a side-scrolling shooter. The only game based on the Batman Beyond franchise, Batman Beyond: Return of the Joker, was released as a companion to the eponymous film for Game Boy Color, PlayStation and Nintendo 64. Batman: Vengeance (2001) was released for several platforms, based on The New Batman Adventures and starring its voice cast, including Mark Hamill as the Joker.

The Joker is featured in the platform game Batman: Return of the Joker, released for the NES in 1991 and the Genesis in 1992. Other games include Batman: Chaos in Gotham (2001) for Game Boy Color, Justice League: Injustice for All (2002) for Game Boy Advance, and Batman: Dark Tomorrow (2003) for GameCube and Xbox. The Joker also makes a cameo in Batman: Rise of Sin Tzu (2003), released for several platforms.

Lego

 The Joker appears in Lego Batman: The Videogame (2008), with his vocal effects provided by Steven Blum. He leads a group of villains—Harley Quinn, Scarecrow, Mad Hatter, and Killer Moth—to spread his toxin in Gotham City. The Joker is playable in several levels of the villain storyline, and can be unlocked as a playable character in the "Free Play" mode as well.
 The Joker returns in Lego Batman 2: DC Super Heroes (2012), voiced by Christopher Corey Smith. He leads a new group of villains to rob the attendees of an award show, but is defeated by Batman and Robin and subsequently sent to Arkham Asylum. Lex Luthor later breaks the Joker out using "The Deconstructor", a kryptonite-powered weapon, so that he could aid his plans of becoming president. To this end, they break into the Batcave, steal Batman's entire supply of kryptonite, and use it to power a giant Joker robot that can dispense a gas that will convince everyone in Gotham to vote for Lex. However, their plans are foiled by the Justice League, who destroy the robot and apprehend the Joker and Luthor. After completing the story mode, the Joker is found as an optional boss fight at Ace Chemicals; after defeating him, he is unlocked as a playable character.
Smith reprises his role as the Joker in Lego Batman 3: Beyond Gotham (2014). During the story, the Joker joins Lex Luthor's Legion of Doom to help him become "President of Earth". To this end, they hijack the weapon system of the Justice League's Watchtower and hold the Earth at ransom, until the League defeats them. Later, the Legion and the League form a temporary alliance to stop Brainiac, but while the heroes are left occupied with him, the villains abandon them to take over the White House. After Brainiac is defeated, the League promptly deals with the Legion, sending them to prison. The Joker and Luthor are forced to share a cell with a miniaturized Braniac, but while mocking him, they accidentally break the bottle he was kept in, causing Brianiac to return to normal proportions. The Joker and Luthor are last seen shaking in fear as Brainiac prepares to get his revenge on them.
The Joker is a playable character in Lego Dimensions (2015), voiced again by Smith. In the story mode, he is a member of Lord Vortech's army of villains that face off against the three main heroes (Batman, Wyldstyle, and Gandalf) in Springfield from The Simpsons. The Lego Batman Movie version of the Joker also appears in the story campaign based on the film, voiced by Dave Wittenberg.
 The Joker is a main character in Lego DC Super-Villains (2018), voiced by Mark Hamill. He and Harley Quinn are first seen breaking into Wayne Tech until Batman captures them, but they are freed when Green Lantern accidentally throws Solomon Grundy into the Batwing. The pair then escape together with Lex Luthor and Mercy Graves. Later, the Joker recruits the Riddler, Scarecrow and Clayface to retrieve his joy buzzer (and the rest of their equipment) from the Gotham City Police Department. Their break-in was successful until the Joker's truck crashed into the Iceberg Lounge, knocking him unconscious. The Joker is arrested and sent to Arkham Asylum, but breaks out with Luthor's help alongside several other villains. Afterward, he works with Clayface, Harley Quinn, and Sinestro to free Black Adam from the Gotham City Museum of History's Egyptian exhibit from Kahndaq. After a boom tube malfunction caused by Luthor, he, Harley, and the Rookie are transported to Apokolips, where they encounter Darkseid at his citadel before being saved by the Justice League. The Joker later travels to Nanda Parbat with Batman and the Flash to enlist the help of the League of Shadows in stopping Darkseid's forces. Following Darkseid's defeat, he escapes the Justice League with the rest of the Legion of Doom regardless of what choice the Rookie makes. The DCAU version of the Joker is also playable via the Batman: The Animated Series downloadable content pack, and serves as the final boss of the level included in the DLC.

Batman: Arkham

Mark Hamill reprises his role as the Joker in the main trilogy of the Batman: Arkham franchise, while Troy Baker voices a younger version of the character in the prequel Arkham Origins. This depiction of the Joker has received widespread acclaim as critics have lauded the voice acting and the exploration of his rivalry with Batman. The Joker won the 2011 Spike Video Game Awards''' "Character of the Year" award for his role in Arkham City.

 In Batman: Arkham Asylum (2009), the Joker takes over Arkham Island in an elaborate trap set for Batman. He releases all of the inmates and injects his thugs with the "Titan formula", a more potent version of Bane's Venom drug, to create an army of genetically-enhanced henchmen. After foiling the other freed villains' agendas, Batman defeats a Titan-enhanced Joker atop Arkham Asylum. In the PlayStation 3 version of the game, the Joker is a playable character in Challenge Maps where opposing thugs are replaced with Arkham guards.
 In Batman: Arkham City (2011), the Joker is involved in a gang war with Two-Face and the Penguin in Professor Hugo Strange's new city-sized prison "Arkham City". He infects Batman with his poisoned blood after it is revealed that he is slowly dying as a result of his Titan overdose in Arkham Asylum, thus motivating Batman to find a cure for them both. Despite Batman's best efforts, the Joker ultimately succumbs to the disease. During the credits, he can be heard singing Only You (And You Alone). The Joker also appears in Batman: Arkham City Lockdown.
 The prequel Batman: Arkham Origins (2013) features the Joker and Batman's first encounter. On Christmas Eve, the Joker kidnaps and poses as "Black Mask" and uses the crime lord's wealth to hire eight assassins to kill the new vigilante in Gotham City. After being apprehended by Batman, the Joker shares his past with Dr. Harleen Quinzel at Blackgate Prison before escaping and taking over the penitentiary. The Joker then attempts to corrupt Batman by coaxing him into killing Bane but fails and realizes his nemesis is his philosophical opposite, thus beginning his obsession with the Dark Knight. During the credits, he can be heard singing Cold, Cold Heart. The Joker is also a playable character in the game's multiplayer mode.
 The Joker appears in Batman: Arkham Origins Blackgate (2013), where he takes over one of the three main wings of Blackgate Prison alongside the Penguin and Black Mask.
 In Batman: Arkham Knight (2015), Batman hallucinates the Joker when the residue of the latter's blood in his system mixes with Scarecrow's fear toxin, causing the Dark Knight to experience the Joker's memories of Barbara Gordon's crippling and Jason Todd's torture, manifesting as a form of split persoanlity. The Joker's blood also infects four other individuals; Henry Adams, Johnny Charisma, Christina Bell, and Albert King, each of whom develops aspects of the Joker's personality and appearance. However, Henry Adams kills the other three and then himself when he realises that Batman is also infected, anticipating that the Joker in Batman will become the "new" Joker. Faced with succumbing to the Joker persona, Batman ultimately breaks free of the Joker's influence when he tricks Scarecrow into injecting his body while the Joker persona is in control, causing the Joker to experience a vision of his own fear of being forgotten by the world. As Batman regains control of himself, he locks the Joker persona away within his mind. During the credits, the Joker can be heard singing Look Who's Laughing Now. He also appears in the Batgirl: A Matter of Family DLC story, depicting a mission set before Arkham Asylum.
 At the end of the PlayStation VR game Batman: Arkham VR (2016), set before Arkham Knight, the Joker takes possession of Batman and murders his loved ones before the entire game is revealed to have been a nightmare in Batman's mind.

Injustice
The Joker appears as a playable character in Injustice: Gods Among Us and its sequel, Injustice 2, developed by NetherRealm Studios, with Richard Epcar reprising the role from Mortal Kombat vs. DC Universe.
 In Injustice: Gods Among Us, set in an alternate universe, the Joker tricks Superman into killing Lois Lane, which detonates a nuclear bomb that destroys Metropolis, killing millions of its citizens. Driven insane, Superman murders this Joker and forms the Regime to take over Earth. The primary universe's version nearly destroys Metropolis with a nuclear bomb as well, but he is accidentally transported to the Regime universe when the Insurgency versions of Batman and Lex Luthor bring most of the prime Justice League to their world. The Joker is ultimately defeated by Insurgency Luthor and taken back to the primary universe by prime Batman.
 In Injustice 2, while still deceased in the Injustice universe, he appears as a hallucination of Harley Quinn's created by Scarecrow's fear gas, though she defeats it and breaks free of the toxin's influence. Outside the storyline, character dialogue indicates that the Joker is either the primary universe iteration, a fear toxin hallucination of the Injustice universe iteration, or that he tricked Nekron into restoring him to life. After executing Brainiac in his Arcade ending, the Joker populates Earth with a number of alien civilizations imprisoned in Brainiac's collection, and watches joyfully as chaos unfolds.

Telltale's Batman

Anthony Ingruber voices the Joker, initially referred to as "John Doe", in Telltale Games' episodic point-and-click graphic adventure Batman video game series.
 The Joker makes his debut in the first season, titled Batman: The Telltale Series. Bruce Wayne meets "John Doe" for the first time as a patient at Arkham Asylum. John gives Bruce information regarding the Children of Arkham's plans before starting a prison riot. John is among the inmates present during Lady Arkham's siege of the asylum and is later seen at a bar in Gotham City watching Bruce/Batman on live television.
 The Joker returns in the second season, titled Batman: The Enemy Within. Agency director Amanda Waller reveals that after being discharged from Arkham, "John Doe" joined a criminal cabal called "The Pact", consisting of the Riddler, Bane, Mr. Freeze, Catwoman, and John's former psychiatrist Harley Quinn, whom John claims to be in love with. When Riddler nearly jeopardizes their plans, John betrays him by giving Bruce sufficient information to arrest him. John later recruits Bruce into the organization and, after secretly deducing that he is Batman, helps him uncover the group's plan to steal the LOTUS virus from a rogue division of the Agency called SANCTUS. After Harley betrays the Pact to escape with the virus, John helps Bruce search for her at a defunct carnival and murders several Agency operatives. Bruce confronts John and either retains his trust or shatters their friendship. The former choice results in John helping Bruce to apprehend Harley, while the latter decision leads to John saving Harley and vowing to become Batman's mortal enemy. Adopting the identity of the "Joker", John either becomes a ruthless vigilante set on bringing Waller to "justice" by any means necessary, or transforms into a psychopathic criminal intent on psychologically torturing Bruce. Regardless of the choices the player makes, Batman ultimately defeats Joker and sends him back to Arkham Asylum. He is last seen in his cell being visited by Bruce or vowing to return.

Mortal Kombat

 The Joker appears as a playable character in Mortal Kombat vs. DC Universe, voiced by Richard Epcar.
 The Joker appears as a guest character in Mortal Kombat 11, with Richard Epcar reprising his role. In contrast to Mortal Kombat vs. DC Universe which was toned down to secure a "T"-rating, this incarnation is more violent than his previous depictions. In his Arcade ending, the Joker kills Kronika and several other characters after acquiring Kronika's Hourglass. Feeling lonesome after his victory, the Joker partners with Havik to form a clique of individuals with a penchant to chaos called "The League of Misunderstood Maniacs".

Other games
 Mark Hamill reprised his role as the Joker in DC Universe Online.
 The Joker appears in Infinite Crisis as a costume for purchase, voiced again by Richard Epcar.
 The Joker was a playable hero in the mobile multiplayer online battle arena game released by Tencent Games, Arena of Valor.
 The Joker was included as a playable outfit in Fortnite.
Joker appears as a playable character in SINoALICE, voiced again by Wataru Takagi.

Theatre
The Joker appears in the 2011 theatrical production Batman Live, portrayed by Mark Frost. He masterminds a plot to defeat Batman by uniting several of the superhero's greatest foes, including Harley Quinn, Penguin, Two-Face, Riddler, Poison Ivy, and Scarecrow. The show is an adaptation of the Batman property, drawing inspiration from the 1966 television series, Tim Burton's series of Batman'' films, and the 1992 animated series, among others.

Actors

References